Stanislav Olehovych Biblyk (born 17 August 2001) is a Ukrainian professional football striker who played for Shakhtar Donetsk.

Career
Biblyk is a product of the Azovstal-2 Mariupol and Shahktar Donetsk youth sportive schools, who played in the Ukrainian Premier League Reserves, and signed a loan contract with FC Mariupol in the Ukrainian Premier League in January 2020.

He continued to play in the Ukrainian Premier League Reserves and made his debut for FC Mariupol in the Ukrainian Premier League in a losing away match against FC Oleksandriya as a substituted second half-time player on 22 August 2020.

References

External links
Statistics at UAF website (Ukr)

2001 births
Living people
People from Yenakiieve
Ukrainian footballers
Ukraine youth international footballers
Association football forwards
FC Shakhtar Donetsk players
FC Mariupol players
FC Akron Tolyatti players
Ukrainian Premier League players
Russian First League players
Ukrainian expatriate footballers
Expatriate footballers in Russia
Ukrainian expatriate sportspeople in Russia
Sportspeople from Donetsk Oblast